Joel Roth (born 8 January 1999) is a Swiss cyclist, who specializes in cross-country mountain biking.

Major results
2017
 1st  UCI World Team Relay Championships
 1st  European Team Relay Championships
 2nd  UCI Junior XCO World Championships
2019
 1st  UCI World Team Relay Championships
 1st  European Team Relay Championships
2020
 1st  European Under-23 XCO Championships
 1st  National Under-23 XCO Championships
 3rd  UCI Under-23 XCO World Championships
2021
 1st  European Under-23 XCO Championships
 3rd  UCI Under-23 XCO World Championships
 3rd Overall UCI Under-23 XCO World Cup
3rd Leogang
3rd Lenzerheide
3rd Snowshoe
2022
 Swiss Bike Cup
3rd Gränichen

References

External links

1999 births
Living people
Swiss male cyclists
Swiss mountain bikers